Accrington Stanley F.C. was founded in October 1968 as a successor to the original Accrington Stanley which had collapsed in 1966. It is based in the Lancashire town of Accrington.

Managerial history
The clubs first manager was Jimmy Hinksman.

Following the departure of manager Leam Richardson on 30 April 2013, then player-coach James Beattie expressed an interest in taking the position. On 13 May 2013, Beattie was appointed Stanley's new manager. After 16 months in the post, Beattie left by mutual consent on 12 September 2014. He managed for 58 matches with a win ratio of 27.6%.

Paul Stephenson was appointed caretaker manager who oversaw a victory against AFC Wimbledon. On 18 September 2014, John Coleman was confirmed as manager of Accrington for his second spell with the club.

List of managers 
Information correct after match played on 9 November 2021. Only competitive matches are counted, except the abandoned 1939–40 Football League season and matches in Wartime Leagues and Cups.
Key
 Names of caretaker managers are supplied where known, and the names of caretaker managers are highlighted in italics and marked with an asterisk (*).
 Names of player-managers are supplied where known, and are marked with a double-dagger.

Notes

References

 
Accrington Stanley F.C.